Madurai Sambavam is a 2009 Tamil language  action film  written and directed by Youreka. It stars Harikumar, Anuya Bhagvath and Karthika, while Radha Ravi, Dhandapani, and Raj Kapoor play supporting roles. The music was composed by John Peter with cinematography by M. Sukumar and editing by P. Sai Suresh. The film released on 4 September 2009.

Plot
Aalamarathaar is dreaded by his enemies in Aattuthotti in Madurai. He involves in "katta panchayat" but strives to do his best for the people in the neighborhood. He is respected by everyone there. He is assisted by his son Azhagar aka Kutty and son-in-law. Gomathi is Kutty’s niece who loves him madly, which he does not reciprocate. Local MP Cutout Ganesan and Assistant Commissioner R. Subramaniam are both keen to bump off Aalamaram and Kutty. Kutty falls in love with a female cop named Caroline Thomas. However, it is revealed that she uses him just to shoot down Aalamaran, so she kills Aalamaran. When Kutty discovers about Caroline's evil nature, he plays along with her for the right time to take revenge. One night, Caroline invited Kutty to her house and seduces him in order to make him stop underworld crimes for her, but he refused, yet they end up making love. After the sex, the next morning, when Caroline comes to her senses and realizes her mistake, she attempts to shoot Kutty, but he kills her and tells her that he knows all her plans.

Cast
 Harikumar as Azhagar aka Kutty
 Anuya Bhagvath as Caroline Thomas
 Karthika as Gomathi
 Radha Ravi as Aalamarathaar, Kutty's father
 Dhandapani as MP Cutout Ganesan
 Raj Kapoor as Assistant Commissioner R. Subramanian
 Santhana Bharathi as Thomas, Caroline's father
 Ponnambalam as MLA
 Anand Babu as Henchman

Soundtrack
Soundtrack was composed by John Peter.
"Vaigai Aatril" - Sriram, Nithyasree
"Oru Ilavum Panju" - Harish Raghavendra, Sadhana Sargam
"Landhu Kuduppom" - Shankar Mahadevan
"Kulathil" - Chinmayi, Hariharan
"Kannazhaga" - Anuradha Sriram

Critical reception
Indiaglitz wrote "All said, `Madurai Sambavam', has some loose ends. But forget the logic, you an enjoy this earthy entertainer." The Hindu wrote "Enough action and good performances are provided by the lead pair and Radha Ravi not to mention a nice cameo by Anand Babu but director Eureka has not made full use of these aspects, the climax proving a spoilsport." B. Balaji wrote "Madurai Sambavam is another movie that features a rowdy as the hero. While most of those movies have the hero romance the heroine and clash with a cop, this one makes those two the one and the same person. The issues that this throws up ensure that the movie cannot be dismissed outright but the fact that those issues haven't been explored very convincingly or interestingly ensures that the film doesn't stand out much either."

References 

2009 films
Films about organised crime in India
Films shot in Madurai
2000s Tamil-language films
Fictional portrayals of the Tamil Nadu Police
Indian gangster films
Films set in Madurai
Indian action films
2009 directorial debut films
2009 action films